Angélica Negrón (1981–present) is a Puerto-Rican composer and multi-instrumentalist recognized for composing music for accordions, robotic instruments, toys, and electronics as well as for chamber ensembles, orchestras, choirs, and films. Angélica is a founding member of the electronic indie band Balún where she sings and plays the accordion. She is currently based in Brooklyn, New York where she is a teaching artist for New York Philharmonic's Very Young Composers program and Lincoln Center Education.

She grew up in San Juan where she received her early education in piano and violin at the Conservatory of Music of Puerto Rico. Caribbean influences can be heard in her work, most notably in Balún, the indie dream-pop band she founded.

Angélica is currently an artist in residence at National Sawdust working on a lip sync opera titled Chimera for drag queen performers and chamber ensemble exploring the ideas of fantasy and illusion as well as the intricacies of identity.

Life 
Angélica Negrón is a Puerto Rican native, born in San Juan, who lives in Brooklyn, New York. As a child, Negrón studied piano and violin at the Conservatory of Music of Puerto Rico. She earned her master's degree at New York University and is working on her doctoral degree in music composition at City University of New York as of 2016. She educates at New York Philharmonic's Very Young Composers Program, Lincoln Center Education, The Little Orchestra Society, and co-founded the Spanish immersion music program for young children. Negrón was selected for a Van Lier Fellowship Program in 2014-2015 and a New York Foundation for the Arts Artist Fellowship in 2016.

Negrón composed pieces for various art forms and entertainment including Memories of a Penitent Heart and Los Condenados. She has been featured in concerts and music festivals including the “Ecstatic Music Festival 2012," MATA Festival 2011, and Bang on a Can Summer Festival 2011. Her collection of instruments began with a Strawberry Shortcake music box, and has expanded with the addition of bells, trumpet, voice box, and whistles. She performs with Balún, an electro-acoustic pop band, and her chamber ensemble, Arturo en el barco. Negrón's music is published by Good Child Music.

Education 
Angélica received an early education in piano and violin at the Conservatory of Music of Puerto Rico where she later studied composition under the guidance of composer Alfonso Fuentes. She holds a master's degree in music composition from New York University where she studied with Pedro da Silva. She pursued doctoral studies at The Graduate Center (CUNY), where she studied composition with Tania León. Her dissertation focused on the work of Meredith Monk. Also active as an educator, Angélica is currently a teaching artist for New York Philharmonic's Very Young Composers program and Lincoln Center Education. Additionally, she co-founded the Spanish immersion music program for young children Acopladitos with Noraliz Ruiz.

Career 
Negrón has been commissioned by the Albany Symphony, Bang on a Can All-Stars, A Far Cry, MATA Festival, loadbang, The Playground Ensemble, the American Composers Orchestra, Kronos Quartet, Prototype Festival, Brooklyn Youth Chorus, Sō Percussion, the Dallas Symphony Orchestra, National Symphony Orchestra, Opera Philadelphia, the Louisville Orchestra and the New York Botanical Garden.

She has collaborated with many artists such as Lido Pimienta, Mathew Placek, Sasha Velour, Cecilia Aldarondo, Mariela Pabón, Adrienne Westwood, Sō Percussion, The Knights, Face the Music and NOVUS NY.

Her music has been performed at the Kennedy Center, the Ecstatic Music Festival, EMPAC, Bang on a Can Marathon and the 2016 New York Philharmonic Biennial. Her film scores have been heard numerous times at the Tribeca Film Festival. Her music has been performed by TRANSIT Ensemble, Choral Chameleon, janus trio, Cadillac Moon Ensemble, Cantori NY, Face the Music, Iktus Percussion Quartet, ETHEL, NYU Symphony Orchestra, Montpelier Chamber Orchestra, Springfield-Drury Civic Orchestra and the Puerto Rico Symphony Orchestra, among others. She has written music for documentaries, films, theater and modern dance. She frequently collaborates with the experimental theater company Y No Había Luz from Puerto Rico, writing music for their plays, which often incorporate puppets, masks and unusual objects.

Upcoming premieres include works for the Seattle Symphony, LA Philharmonic, NY Philharmonic Project 19 initiative and multiple performances at Big Ears Festival 2022. Negrón continues to perform and compose for film.

Balún (2003–Present)

Members: Andrés Fontánez, Angélica Negrón, José A. Olivares, Noraliz Ruíz

Founded by Angélica Negrón and her husband, José A. Oliveres, Balún is an experimental electronic band originally from the San Juan indie scene. The band has been described as dreampop with reggaeton influences. They incorporate the use of drum machines, bomba barrel drums, jíbaro guitarillos, and cuatro, infusing their sound with their Caribbean background. They refer to their sound as “dreambow,” a mix of the terms dreampop and dembow, the musical term to describe a rhythm originating from Jamaica.

Their 2016 single, "La Nueva Ciudad” broke into Spotify's Viral Top 50 globally and in eight Latin American countries. (npr.org)
 Albums:

Something Comes Our Way - 2006

An EP Collection - 2006

Memoria Textil - 2010

Prisma Tropical - 2018
 Singles and EPs:

EP1 - 2003

Nada Que Hacer Hoy - 2003

While Sleeping - 2004

Snol EP - 2006

Camila - 2011

El Medio Contenido - 2011

La Luna - 2012

Recognition 
Recipient of the 2022 Hermitage Greenfield Prize.

Selected by Q2 and NPR listeners as part of “The Mix: 100 Composers Under 40” 

Selected by Flavorpill as one of the “10 Young Female Composers You Should Know” 

Selected as one of the recipients for NYFA's 2016 Artists’ Fellowship Program.

Compositions

Orchestra 
 Un dos, tres (2019)
 Sonidos del Avistamiento (2019)
 Mapping (2017)
 Me he Perdido (2015)
 What Keeps Me Awake (2008)
 Parallel Synchronized Randomness (2007)
 Pequeño sueño en rojo (2005)

Large Ensemble 
 Begin at the Beginning (2018) middle school string ensemble
 The Blue Hour, a collaborative song cycle by Shara Nova, Caroline Shaw, Rachel Grimes, Sarah Kirkland and Angélica Negrón (2016) string orchestra and mezzo-soprano
 El gran caleidoscopio (2012) large ensemble
 Diario Vietnam, suite from the film score (2004) string orchestra

Chamber Ensemble 
 Conversación a distancia (2020) clarinet, vibraphone, piano, violin, cello and electronics
 Marejada (2020) string quartet and fixed electronics
 Say Something in Spanish (2020) soprano, clarinet, tenor sax, violin, cello, 2 percussionists
 These Strings (2019) baritone voice, 2 violins, viola, cello and bass
 Fruity Roll On Sparkly Lip Gloss (2019) flute, bass clarinet, tenor sax, cello, drum set, piano (4 hands) MPK mini (live electronics)
 Why Does the Moon Keep Following Us? (2019) flute, clarinet, piano and fixed electronics
 Gone (2019) percussion quartet and robotic percussion
 Turistas (2018) bass clarinet, SPD drum pad, electric guitar, MIDI keyboard, cello and double bass
 Still Here (2017) harp, tenor saxophone, electronics
 This Person (2016) female voice, flute, clarinet, French horn, percussion (live electronics), 2 violins, viola, cello and double bass
 Dóabin (2015) baritone voice, trumpet, trombone, bass clarinet and fixed electronics
 Dust (2015) flute, clarinet, violin, cello and fixed electronics
 Cosmorama (2015) violin, French horn, piano (4 hands) and fixed electronics
 Stereogram (2014) 2 oboes, 2 bassoons,  pre-recorded electronics
 There and Not Here (2014) string quartet and percussion quartet
 La isla mágica (2013) bass and fixed electronics
 Was I the Same When I Woke Up This Morning? (2011) Orff xylophone and Celtic harp
 Bubblegum grass/peppermint field (2011) string quartet and fixed electronics
 Four Ways to Eat Cereal (2010) 2 percussionists, bass, clarinet
 Quimbombó (2010) flute, violin, cello and percussion
 Tembleque (2010) flute, violin, cello, percussion
 I Can Still Hear You (2009) accordion and fixed electronics
 Drawings for Meyoko (2009) lute, viola/banjo, hard and electronics
 Count to Five (2009) percussion quartet
 What I'm Trying To Say Is... (2009) violin, cello, bass clarinet, percussion and piano
 They Swim Under My Bed (2008) 3 violins (or 2 violins and viola) and piano
 The Flying Trapeze (2008) woodwind quintet
 PSR (2007) accordion and prepared piano
 Tres insultos para dos violines (2004) 2 violins
 Triste silencio programático (2002) string quartet

Solo 
 Cooper and Emma (2020) violin
 Parallax (2018) piano and MPK mini (live electronics)
 Las Desaparecidas (2016) cello and fixed electronics
 The Place We Are (2014) keyboard and live electronics
 Hush (2013) flute and fixed electronics
 Panorama (2012) cello and fixed electronics
 The Little Things (2011) toy instruments and live electronics
 The Peculiar Purple Pie-man of Porcupine Peak (2011) piano and fixed electronics
 Alguien sube por el camino inventado (2008) cello
 Technicolor (2008) harp and fixed electronics
 Columpio (2008) toy piano and live electronics 
 La intervención (2008) piano
 Mercedes (2007) guitar 
 La bicicleta de cristal (2003) vibraphone
 Sueño recurrente No. 1 veo carros fantasmas (2002) piano

Vocal 
 Calladita (2020) SSAA chorus
 Cosecha (2020) SSAA chorus
 Chorus of the Forest (2019) SATB chorus, robotic percussion, and fixed electronics
 I Shouldn't be up here (2019) SSAA chorus, electric guitar and percussion
 Letras para cantar (2019) three female voices and electronics
 Paradise (2019) SATB chorus and fixed electronics
 Nada Mejor que una persona (2018) SSAA chorus
 FONO (2011) SATB chorus and fixed electronics 
 There Once Was (2011) SATB chorus, accordion and fixed electronics
 Mi Lumia (2009) 3 female voices 
 Parsimonia (2005) 6 female voices
 Malabarismos (2005) flute and female voice
 Pensamiento no. 1 (2003) piano and female voice
 Catorce menos (2013) harp and children's voice

Ballet 
 “Casa tomada” for chamber orchestra (2006)

Filmography 
 Landfall, Cecilia Aldarondo (2020)
 The First Rainbow Coalition, Ray Santisteban (2019)
 Todos ibamos a ser reyes, Marel Malaret (2019)
 The Feeling of Being Watched, Assia Boundaoui (2018)
 Councilwoman, Margo Guernsey (2018) 
 Sol de Medianoche, Douglas Sánchez (2017)
 Love the Sinner, Jessica Devaney (2017)
 Memories of a Penitent Heart, Cecilia Aldarondo (2016)
 Los condenados, Robertp Busó Garcia (2012)
 Sisterhood of the Night, Jeffrey Moss (2006)
 How the Dodo Became Extinct, Shelley Dodson (2005)
 Diario Vietnam, Alfredo Rivas (2004)

Opera 
 The Island We Made (2021)

References 

Puerto Rico articles needing expert attention
Composers articles needing expert attention
Puerto Rican classical composers
Women classical composers
1981 births
Living people
21st-century classical composers
21st-century American women musicians
Musicians from San Juan, Puerto Rico
New York University alumni
City University of New York alumni
21st-century women composers